The Warrnambool railway line (also known as the South West line, formerly known as the Port Fairy railway line) is a railway serving the south west of Victoria, Australia. Running from the western Melbourne suburb of Newport through the cities of Geelong and Warrnambool, the line once terminated at the coastal town of Port Fairy before being truncated to Dennington (just west of Warrnambool). This closed section of line has been converted into the 37 km long Port Fairy to Warrnambool Rail Trail. The line continues to see both passenger and freight services today.

Services

Metro Trains Melbourne operates suburban passenger services along the inner section of the line as far as Werribee, while V/Line operates the Geelong and the Warrnambool services. For 11 years, from 19 September 1993 until 31 August 2004, the Melbourne to Warrnambool passenger service was run by the private West Coast Railway company. Freight services also run on the line, operated by Pacific National and, for a brief period, El Zorro to the WestVic container terminal, between Warrnambool and Dennington.

History

The Warrnambool line was originally built by the private Geelong and Melbourne Railway Company and opened on 25 June 1857, the line being sold to the Victorian Railways in 1860. The line was designed by English engineer Edward Snell, and built as a single track. The standard of engineering was called into question as the light timber bridges required extra maintenance and had a short life span, while the decision to build only a single track resulted in slow and infrequent trains. Travelers between Melbourne and Geelong continued to prefer the bay steamers across Port Phillip Bay, leading to diminished profits for the company. At a railway commission enquiry, Snell defended his approach as necessary to complete the work in time, with the expectation that the engineering works would be upgraded as traffic and revenue increased. The railway had the misfortune of a fatal accident on its first run. The company's superintendent - and a friend of Snell's - was struck when leaning out of the train's engine as it approached a bridge. An inquiry cleared the company of any negligence.

The line was progressively duplicated from the 1950s to the 1980s.

The line was later extended south-west, to Winchelsea in 1876, Colac in 1877, Camperdown in 1883, Terang in 1877 and Warrnambool, Dennington and Port Fairy in 1890. This line is now closed beyond Warrnambool, with the last train leaving Port Fairy on 10 September 1977, hauled by B75, with the line officially closing on 12 September 1977. A branch line was built from Koroit (between Warrnambool and Port Fairy) to Hamilton (on the Ararat – Portland railway), via Penshurst, in 1890. At the same time a short-lived connection was opened between Penshurst and Dunkeld (also on the Ararat – Portland railway). It closed eight years later.

Branch lines were also constructed from South Geelong to Queenscliff in 1879, from Moriac (between Geelong and Winchelsea) to Wensleydale and Terang to Mortlake in 1890, from Birregurra (between Winchelsea and Colac) to Forrest in 1891, from Camperdown to Timboon in 1892, from Irrewarra (east of Colac) to Cressy in 1910, and from Colac to Alvie in 1923.

A  narrow gauge branch was also opened from Colac to Beech Forest in 1902, principally to carry timber, and was extended to Weeaproniah and Crowes in 1911.

The branch lines began to be closed from the late 1940s, the Wensleydale line being the first in 1948, followed by the Forrest line in 1957, the Irrewarra line in 1953, the Alvie line in 1954, the Beech Forest line in 1962 (the section from Weeaproniah to Crowes having been closed in 1954), and the Timboon line in 1988.

In 1993 West Coast Railway won the government tender to operate passenger services to Warrnambool using former Victorian Railways locomotives and rolling stock, including a regular steam hauled service. West Coast Railway ceased operations in 2004 handing the services back to government control by V/Line.

New Marshall and Waurn Ponds stations opened along the line in April 2005 and October 2014 respectively.

In July 2012, the Minister for Public Transport announced that a new crossing loop would be constructed on the line at Warncoort, between Birregurra and Colac. Tenders were called for in August. The loop opened in April 2014.

In 2017, the Victorian State Government announced upgrades to allow VLocity railcars to travel to Warrnambool. The Warrnambool line upgrades, as part of Regional Rail Revival, include new signalling, level crossing upgrades and a second track between Boorcan and Weerite, either side of Camperdown. Other upgrades of the line (Geelong line upgrade) as part of the Regional Rail Revival include the duplication of track between South Geelong and Waurn Ponds and an upgrade of Waurn Ponds station.

References

External links
 Rail Geelong: Line History

Railway lines in Victoria (Australia)
Railway lines opened in 1857
5 ft 3 in gauge railways in Australia
1890 establishments in Australia
Transport in the City of Hobsons Bay
Transport in the City of Wyndham
Transport in Barwon South West (region)